The Peshtigo River is a  tributary of Green Bay in the U.S. state of Wisconsin. The Peshtigo Fire happened in the river's vicinity, and some survivors used the river for refuge from the flames. A section of whitewater on the river called the Roaring Rapids is well known in the region. Further downstream there are two dams known as Caldron Falls Dam and High Falls Dam before collecting the Thunder River.

Geography
The Peshtigo River is formed in Forest County and flows southeasterly towards the bay of Green Bay, spending most of its time winding through Marinette County.

History
It shares its name with the city of Peshtigo, which was destroyed by the Peshtigo Fire on October 8, 1871.  The fire was the deadliest fire in the history of the United States. According to stories of survivors, many people fled for the river to escape the inferno.

See also
List of Wisconsin rivers

Notes

Rivers of Wisconsin
Rivers of Forest County, Wisconsin
Rivers of Marinette County, Wisconsin